Balázs Szokolay (born 2 July 1961) is a Hungarian pianist.

Szokolay was born in Budapest. His father is Hungarian composer Sándor Szokolay. His international concert career started in 1983, when he replaced Nikita Magaloff at a concert in Belgrade. Four years later he was appointed a professorship at the Franz Liszt Academy of Music. Throughout his career he has been awarded 14 competition prizes (Zwickau's Robert Schumann, Leeds', Brussels' Queen Elisabeth, Munich's ARD, Terni's Alessandro Casagrande, Monza's Rina Sala Gallo, etc.).

In 2001 the Hungarian Government awarded him the Liszt Prize.

External links
 
 Chopin Foundation of the United States
 biography on the Naxos website

Living people
1961 births
Hungarian classical pianists
Male classical pianists
Prize-winners of the Leeds International Pianoforte Competition
Musicians from Budapest
Franz Liszt Academy of Music alumni
Academic staff of the Franz Liszt Academy of Music
20th-century classical pianists
20th-century Hungarian male musicians
20th-century Hungarian musicians
21st-century classical pianists
21st-century Hungarian male musicians
21st-century Hungarian musicians